The Wings of the Sphinx  (orig. Italian Le ali della sfinge) is a 2006 novel by Andrea Camilleri, translated into English in 2009 by Stephen Sartarelli. It is the eleventh novel in the internationally popular Inspector Montalbano series.

Summary

It's a dark period that Montalbano is going through, especially for his stormy relationship with partner Livia, whom he has recently betrayed with another woman (in the previous episode). Moreover, his police work adds to the personal problems, with administrative frustrations (the precinct is running out of gasoline for their police cars, and there are no new supplies) and operational hindrances from his superiors.

So the usual phone call from Catarella is more than welcome, even though it inevitably comes when the inspector is in the shower. A girl's body has been found in a dump (on a beach in the TV episode), left there as waste to get rid of. Only one distinguishing sign: a sphinx butterfly tattooed on the shoulder. Coroner Pasquano is convinced the actual murder has taken place elsewhere, the day before.

Montalbano discovers that the girl, who emigrated to Italy from Russia with other young people like her, was hosted and assisted by a Catholic charity organisation that seems to have something to hide. What convinces Montalbano that things are as he suspects is the fact that the other girls came from the same country and have the same tattoo, and are now all sponsored by this Catholic charity. Naturally, his chief summons him and advises him to use the utmost caution, since important politicians and prelates are involved.

2006 Italian novels
Inspector Montalbano novels
Italian crime novels
Italian mystery novels
Novels set in Sicily